Żochowo may refer to the following places:
Żochowo, Ostrów Mazowiecka County in Masovian Voivodeship (east-central Poland)
Żochowo, Sierpc County in Masovian Voivodeship (east-central Poland)
Żochowo, Pomeranian Voivodeship (north Poland)